Alex Doyle may refer to:

 Alexander Doyle (1857–1922), American sculptor
 Alex Doyle (Australian footballer) (1904–1973), Australian rules footballer
 Alex Doyle (footballer, born 2001), British footballer